was a Japanese long-distance runner. He competed in the men's 5000 metres at the 1920 Summer Olympics.

References

External links

1896 births
1989 deaths
Athletes (track and field) at the 1920 Summer Olympics
Japanese male long-distance runners
Olympic athletes of Japan
Place of birth missing